The Ak Jol People's Party (sometimes romanized as Ak Zhol, is a Kyrgyz political party founded by President Kurmanbek Bakiyev on 15 October 2007 to contest the parliamentary election to be held in December 2007.

It gained 71 of the 90 seats in the 2007 elections and was one of the three parties to enter into the parliament, obtaining most of its support from the south of the country. However, following the Kyrgyz Revolution of 2010, snap elections were called, and the party lost all of its seats. It did not re-enter parliament thereafter, and it is defunct.

Election results

Jogorku Kenesh

Presidential

References

Political parties established in 2007
Political parties in Kyrgyzstan